is a town in Yoshino District, Nara Prefecture, Japan.

, the town has an estimated population of 5,378 and a population density of 86.8 persons per km². The total area is 61.99 km².

The town is perhaps most famous for the Tsurube sushi shop, which is featured in the popular kabuki play Yoshitsune Senbon Zakura. The shop still operates today and claims to have existed as far back as the 17th century. There are several restaurants and tea houses throughout the town offering sushi, okonomiyaki, udon, takoyaki, and soba.

Shimoichi has many factories making waribashi (disposable chopsticks), as well as onsen, persimmon orchards, shops specializing in shrine ornaments and woodwork, a bathsalts plant, and a regional dessert souvenir factory. There are also konnyaku, sōmen and soba factories.

Shimoichi also has its own television station, Shimoichi Terebi, which offers news coverage, local sightseeing information and tours, as well as public information such as fire, earthquake and storm updates. Shimoichi Terebi offers a large amount of local coverage of sports and cultural festivals.

Train access
Shimoichi may be reached via the Minami Osaka Line of the Kintetsu Railway.

Geography
Shimoichi sits between mountains covered with pinetrees and bamboo along the Yoshino River, southwest of Nara City.

Surrounding municipalities
 Nara Prefecture
 Yoshino
 Kurotaki
 Ōyodo
 Gojō

Festivals

Hatsuichi,  which means "first market", is an annual festival in early February. Before supermarkets and other modern conveniences existed, the townspeople gathered every ten days for a market. Hatsuichi marked the first market of the new lunar year. Over time Hatsuichi and the local Ebisu Shrine joined in creating the modern festival.  Ebisu is a god of business and one of the seven "lucky gods" derived from China. The Ebisu Shrine is decorated with lanterns, traditional ornaments and colors for the festival, which now marks the annual opening of the shrine. On the afternoon of Hatsuichi a portable shrine is paraded through the town.

In July, the neighboring town of Oyodo hosts the Yoshino-gawa festival, which includes a fireworks display.

In early October, the town holds a sports festival in honor of Japan's national Health and Sports Day. An opening ceremony including fireworks and the lighting of an Olympic-style torch takes place as neighborhoods compete in various games. Prizes are awarded on the neighborhood and town level, and may include items such as bags of rice, bicycles, toaster ovens, heaters, tissues, beer, game systems, and various household items. The town's schools also participate in the event with various dances and performances.

The Aki Matsuri (Fall or Autumn Festival) is held in mid- to late October. Activities include a parade of lanterns and drums down the main street to one of the town's temples near the top of a mountain. The town's bunkasai (cultural festival) also takes place around this time, with numerous performances by townspeople and local school children, as well as displays of calligraphy, pottery, paintings, and flower arrangements by local artists in the town's cultural hall.

Education
Shimoichi has one public kindergarten, one elementary school, and one junior high school.

The junior high school has over 200 students, and about 30 faculty and staff members. Its mascot is a dragonfly. School clubs include volleyball, chorus, brass band, art, shuji (calligraphy), baseball, track and field, English, and table tennis. The chorus club has a 50-year first-place winning streak. The baseball club also has a good prefectural reputation and was chosen to participate in a prefectural baseball tournament during the 2007-2008 school year.

The Shimoichi Board of Education is a participant in the JET (Japan Exchange and Teaching) Programme. The JET Programme is a Japanese government initiative which aims to promote internationalization in Japan’s local communities by helping to improve foreign language education and developing international exchange at the community level. Shimoichi has two native English speakers who work as Assistant Language Teachers (ALT). One is placed predominantly at Shimoichi Elementary, while the other is placed at Shimoichi Junior High. The junior high school has had an ALT since 1997, while the elementary school first acquired an ALT in 2006.

History

The area is thought to have been inhabited by the Yamato people in prehistoric times, with archaeological evidence indicating activity in the area as far back as the Jōmon period. What is now the town of Shimoichi has stood as the "entrance to Yoshino" since the Heian period (794-1185). It flourished as the main business district of the Yoshino region, with "Shimoichi bills" being issued as Japan's first commercial bills.

In 1889 surrounding villages were consolidated and Shimoichi village was established. It became a town in 1890. Two more villages, Akino and Niu, were absorbed into the town in :1956.

Notable places
 Niukawakami Shrine
 Ryudouin
 Hirobashi Cherry tree Forest
 Gangyō temple

Nearby attractions
 Niukawakami Shrine
 Ryudouin
 Kabutomushi Park
 Shimoichi onsen, which has separate bathing areas for men and women as well as a restaurant.
 Yoshino:  a spring tourist attraction due to its millions of sakura (cherry blossoms), ten minutes from the town via Shimoichi-guchi Kintetsu train station
 Asuka, 20 minutes from the town via Shimoichi-guchi Kintetsu train station
 Kashihara Shrine, 40 minutes from the town via Shimoichi-guchi Kintetsu train station
 Aruru Diamond City Aeon Mall, 50 minutes from the town via Kintetsu train to Yamato-yagi and then Nara Kotsu bus from Yamato-yagi station.

References

External links

  

Towns in Nara Prefecture